Out of the Shadows may refer to:

Films
Out of the Shadows (unfinished film), an unfinished 1931 film
Out of the Shadows (2012 film), a documentary film
Teenage Mutant Ninja Turtles: Out of the Shadows, a 2016 film

Music
Out of the Shadows (The Shadows album), a 1962 album by the British group The Shadows
Out of the Shadows (Dave Grusin album), a 1982 album by Dave Grusin
Out of the Shadows (Billy Joe Royal album), a 1990 album by Billy Joe Royal
 "Out of the Shadows", a song on Iron Maiden's 2006 album A Matter of Life and Death

Video games
Out of the Shadows (video game), a 1984 video game
PK: Out of the Shadows, a 2002 video game
Teenage Mutant Ninja Turtles: Out of the Shadows (video game), a 2013 video game

Other uses
Out of the Shadows, a video by the British group Hawkwind
Alien: Out of the Shadows, a 2014 book by Tim Lebbon

See also 
Out of the Shadow (disambiguation)
Out of Shadows, a 2010 children's novel